

Karl Britzelmayr (26 May 1894  – 9 March 1988) was a general in the Wehrmacht of Nazi Germany during World War II who commanded several divisions. He was also a recipient of the Knight's Cross of the Iron Cross.

Awards and decorations

 Knight's Cross of the Iron Cross on 2 February 1942 as Oberstleutnant and commander of Infanterie-Regiment 217
 German Cross in Gold on 9 June 1943 as Oberst in Grenadier-Regiment 217

References

Citations

Bibliography

 
 

1894 births
1988 deaths
People from Passau
People from the Kingdom of Bavaria
Major generals of the German Army (Wehrmacht)
German Army personnel of World War I
Recipients of the Gold German Cross
Recipients of the clasp to the Iron Cross, 1st class
Recipients of the Knight's Cross of the Iron Cross
German prisoners of war in World War II held by the United States
Military personnel from Bavaria
German Army generals of World War II